The 2021 PBA 3x3 season was the inaugural season of the PBA 3x3, the 3x3 basketball league of the Philippine Basketball Association.

Postponement
The inaugural season was supposed to be held in 2020, with all 12 franchise teams of the main PBA to field their own teams. Mighty Sports and Dunkin Donuts reportedly were interesting in also fielding teams in the PBA 3x3. The inaugural season was supposed to start with the 3×3 Philippine Cup in March 2020, but was postponed to 2021 by June 2020 due to the COVID-19 pandemic with the PBA preoccupied with plans to resume the season of its main league during that time.

The PBA 3x3 inaugural season was initially scheduled to be held in parallel with the 2021 PBA season, which opened on April 11, 2021, but was further postponed. The inaugural PBA 3x3 season commenced on November 20, 2021.

Teams
All 12 franchise teams of the main 5-a-side Philippine Basketball Association are eligible to field a 3x3 team for the 2021 PBA 3x3 season. The Alaska Aces and Blackwater Bossing decided not to field a team, while three guest teams (Pioneer, Platinum, and Zamboanga) participated. Another guest team, Master Sardines, joined before the second conference to become the 14th team of the tournament. The Zamboanga Valientes took a leave of absence during the second conference, but returned during the third conference.

Four of the participating franchising teams Magnolia Hotshots, NLEX Road Warriors, Phoenix Super LPG Fuel Masters and Rain or Shine Elasto Painters announced in November they would be competing in the PBA 3x3 under different team names; Purefoods TJ Titans, Cavitex Braves, Limitless Appmasters, and Sista Super Sealers respectively.

Format
The inaugural PBA 3x3 season had three tournaments or conference. Each conference had six two-day legs and a grand final. The 13 teams were divided into three pools, with pool A having five teams while pools B and C having four each. Teams within their pools play in a single round-robin format. The top three teams of pool A and the top two teams of pools B and C directly qualify for the quarterfinals. The third-best teams of pools B and C played in a knockout game prior to the quarterfinals. The knockout stage is a single-elimination tournament and a third place game is also held. The winner of each leg gets ₱100,000, the runner-up gets ₱50,000, while the third placed team gets ₱30,000. The seedings and pool compositions for each leg are based on the results of the preceding leg. For the third conference, there were 14 teams divided into four pools, with pools A and C having four teams while pools B and D having three each. The top two teams of each pool advanced to the quarterfinals.

After six legs, the cumulative standings were calculated and the top four teams directly qualified for the quarterfinals of the Grand Finals. The fifth to tenth-placed teams qualified for the preliminary round of the Grand Finals. The bottom teams were not qualified for the Grand Finals. The Grand Champion gets ₱750,000, the runner-up gets ₱250,000, while the third placed team gets ₱100,000.

Transactions

Coaching changes

First conference

The conference started on November 20, 2021, and ended on December 29.

Legs summary

Grand Finals

Preliminary round

Pool A

Pool B

Knockout stage

Bracket
Seed refers to the position of the team after six legs. Letter and number inside parentheses denotes the pool letter and pool position of the team, respectively, after the preliminary round of the Grand Finals.

Second conference

The second conference was originally scheduled to start on January 8, 2022, but was suspended after Metro Manila was put on Alert Level 3 due to the rising COVID-19 cases. The conference started on February 19 and ended on April 27.

Legs summary

Grand Finals

Preliminary round

Pool A

Pool B

Knockout stage

Bracket
Seed refers to the position of the team after six legs. Letter and number inside parentheses denotes the pool letter and pool position of the team, respectively, after the preliminary round of the Grand Finals.

Third conference
The conference started on May 21, 2022, and ended on July 3.

Legs summary

Grand Finals

Preliminary round

Pool A

Pool B

Knockout stage

Bracket
Seed refers to the position of the team after six legs. Letter and number inside parentheses denotes the pool letter and pool position of the team, respectively, after the preliminary round of the Grand Finals.

Notes

References

3x3
Pba 3x3
Pba